Lost In The Game is the twelfth studio album by electronic music producer Kid606, released in 2012 through Tigerbeat6. It is his first album to not contain any samples.

Track listing

References

External links
 

2012 albums
Kid606 albums
Tigerbeat6 albums